Alejandro González Iñárritu (credited since 2016 as Alejandro G. Iñárritu; born 15 August 1963) is a Mexican filmmaker. He is primarily known for making modern psychological drama films about the human condition. His projects have garnered critical acclaim and numerous accolades including four Academy Awards with a Special Achievement Award, three Golden Globe Awards, three BAFTA Awards, two Directors Guild of America Awards. His most notable films include Amores perros (2000), 21 Grams (2003), Babel (2006), Biutiful (2010), Birdman (2014), The Revenant (2015), and Bardo (2022).

Iñárritu's films, Amores Perros (2000), and Biutiful (2010) each received Academy Award for Best International Feature Film nominations. He earned critical and commercial success for his films 21 Grams (2003), and Babel (2006). He won three Academy Awards for Best Picture, Best Director, and Best Original Screenplay for Birdman (2014). The following year, he received a consecutive Best Director Oscar for The Revenant (2015). Iñárritu was awarded a Special Achievement Academy Award for his virtual reality installation Carne y Arena (2017).

Iñárritu is the first Mexican filmmaker to be nominated for either director or producer in the history of the Academy Awards, the first to win an Academy Award for Best Original Screenplay and for Best Picture, the first to receive the Best Director Award at Cannes, and the first to win a DGA Award for Outstanding Directing. In 2019, Iñárritu became the first Latin American to serve as President of the Jury for the 72nd Cannes Film Festival. Iñárritu and Mexican filmmakers Alfonso Cuarón and Guillermo del Toro are known in the film industry as "The Three Amigos".

Early life
Iñárritu was born on 15 August 1963 in Mexico City, the youngest of seven siblings, to Luz María Iñárritu and Héctor González Gama. His maternal grandfather, Alfredo Iñárritu y Ramírez de Aguilar, was a prominent lawyer, judge, and justice of the Supreme Court of Mexico with partial Basque origins. Héctor was a banker who owned a ranch, but went bankrupt when Iñárritu was five. A poor student, Iñárritu was expelled from high school at the age of 16 or 17 due to poor grades and misbehavior. He briefly ran off with a girl from a wealthy family to Acapulco, having been influenced by the Miloš Forman film Hair, but returned to Mexico City after a week.

Soon after, Iñárritu left home and worked as a sailor on cargo boats, taking two trips at the ages of 16 and 18, sailing through the Mississippi River and then visiting Europe and Africa. With $1,000 supplied by his father, Iñárritu stayed in Europe for a year on the second trip. He has noted that these early travels as a young man have had a great influence on him as a filmmaker, and the settings of his films have often been in the places he visited during this period. After his travels, Iñárritu returned to Mexico City and majored in communications at Universidad Iberoamericana.

Career

Early career 

Iñárritu began his career in 1984 as a radio host at the Mexican radio station WFM, the country's most popular rock music station, where he "pieced together playlists into a loose narrative arc". He worked with and interviewed artists like Robert Plant, David Gilmour, Elton John, Bob Geldof and Carlos Santana. He also wrote and broadcast small audio stories and storytelling promos. He later became the youngest producer for Televisa, the largest mass media company in Latin America. From 1987 to 1989, he composed music for six Mexican feature films. During this time, Iñárritu became acquainted with Mexican writer Guillermo Arriaga, beginning their screenwriting collaborations. Iñárritu has stated that he believes music has had a bigger influence on him as an artist than film itself.

In the early 1990s, Iñárritu created Z Films, a production company, with Raul Olvera in Mexico. Under Z Films, he started writing, producing and directing short films and advertisements. Making the final transition into TV and film directing, he studied under well-known theater director Ludwik Margules, as well as Judith Weston in Los Angeles. In 1995, Iñárritu wrote and directed his first TV pilot for Z Films, called Detrás del dinero, or Behind the Money, starring Miguel Bosé.

2000s 
Death trilogy (2000-2006)

In 2000, Iñárritu directed his first feature film Amores perros, written by Guillermo Arriaga. Amores perros explored Mexican society in Mexico City told via three intertwining stories. In 2000, Amores perros premiered at the Cannes Film Festival and won the Critics' Week Grand Prize. It was the film debut of actor Gael García Bernal, who would later appear in Babel and the Iñárritu-produced Mexican film Rudo y Cursi. Amores perros was 
the first installment in Iñárritu's and Arriaga's thematic "Death trilogy", and nominated for the Academy Award for Best Foreign Language Film.

After the success of Amores Perros, Iñárritu and Arriaga revisited the intersected-stories structure of Amores perros in Iñárritu's second feature film, 21 Grams (2003). The film starred Benicio del Toro, Naomi Watts and Sean Penn. It was selected to compete for the Golden Lion at the Venice Film Festival, where Penn received the Volpi Cup for Best Actor. At the 76th Academy Awards, Del Toro and Watts received nominations for their performances.

Iñárritu embarked on his third and last film that formed the "Death Trilogy", Babel (2006), written again by Arriaga. Babel comprises four interrelated stories set in Morocco, Mexico, the United States, and Japan, in four different languages. The film stars Brad Pitt, Cate Blanchett, Adriana Barraza, Gael Garcia Bernal, Rinko Kikuchi and Kōji Yakusho. The rest of the cast comprised non-professional actors. The film competed at the 2006 Cannes Film Festival, where Iñárritu received the Best Director Award (Prix de la mise en scène), becoming the first Mexican-born director to win the award.

Babel was a critical and box office success. It received seven nominations at the 79th Academy Awards, including Best Picture and Best Director. Gustavo Santaolalla, the film's composer, won the Academy Award for Best Original Score. The film won the Golden Globe Award for Best Motion Picture – Drama in 2007. Iñárritu became the first Mexican director to be nominated for the Academy Award for Best Directing and the Directors Guild of America Award for Outstanding Directing. After this third feature film collaboration with writing partner Arriaga, Iñárritu and he professionally parted ways, following Iñárritu's barring of Arriaga from the set during filming. Arriaga told the Los Angeles Times in 2009, "It had to come to an end, but I still respect [González Iñárritu]."

2010s
Biutiful (2010)

In 2010, Iñárritu directed and produced Biutiful, starring Javier Bardem, written by Iñárritu, Armando Bó Jr., and Nicolás Giacobone. The film premiered at the Cannes Film Festival in May 2010. Bardem went on to win Best Actor (shared with Elio Germano for La nostra vita) at Cannes. Biutiful is Iñárritu's first film in his native Spanish since his debut feature Amores perros. The film was nominated at the 2011 Golden Globes for Best Foreign Language Film, and at the BAFTA Awards for Best Film Not in the English Language and Best Actor. For the second time in his career, Iñárritu's film was nominated for Best Foreign Language Film at the Academy Awards; Javier Bardem's performance was also nominated for the Academy Award for Best Actor.

Birdman (2014)

In 2014, Iñárritu ultimately won three Academy Awards for directing, co-writing and co-producing Best Picture winner Birdman or (The Unexpected Virtue of Ignorance), starring Michael Keaton, Edward Norton, Emma Stone, Naomi Watts, Zach Galifianakis, and Andrea Riseborough. The film is an existential dark comedy exploring the ego of a forgotten superhero actor, experienced as if filmed on a single shot. It was the first time a Mexican Filmmaker received Best Picture at the Academy Awards. He also won the Golden Globe Award for Best Screenplay, a DGA Award and a PGA Award for the film.

The Revenant (2015)

The following year, Iñárritu directed The Revenant, initially adapted by Mark L. Smith, before joined the writing process, based on Michael Punke's novel of the same name. The film  is a remake   of the film Man in the Wilderness (1971) and starred Leonardo DiCaprio, Tom Hardy, Domhnall Gleeson, and Will Poulter. It is a "gritty" 19th-century period drama-thriller about fur trapper Hugh Glass, a real person who joined the Rocky Mountain Fur Company on a "journey into the wild" and was robbed and abandoned after being mauled by a grizzly bear. The film considers the nature and stresses on relationships under the duress of the wilderness, and issues of revenge and pardon via Glass's pursuit of the man who was responsible for his hardship. The Revenant took nine months to shoot. With The Revenant being a critical and commercial success, Iñárritu won a second consecutive Oscar for Best Director and was nominated for 12 Academy Awards, including Best Picture and Best Director, winning Best Director, Best Cinematography and Best Actor. Iñárritu is one of only three directors to ever win consecutive Oscars, and the first to do it in 65 years. He was also nominated for four Golden Globe Awards, winning three, including Best Motion Picture – Drama and Best Director; received nine Critics' Choice Movie Awards nominations, including Best Picture and Best Director; five BAFTAs including Best Picture and Best Director; and a DGA Award, making history as the first person to ever win two in a row.

The One Percent, originally planned as an upcoming American television drama series created and written by Iñárritu, Alexander Dinelaris Jr., Nicolás Giacobone and Armando Bó, was eventually postponed on early March 2017 due to Alejandro feeling burnt out after the production of The Revenant. The quartet, who also collaborated on Birdman, were to serve as executive producers. Iñárritu was set to direct the first two episodes and set the visual style of the show.

2020s
In 2020, it was reported that Iñárritu would write, direct, and produce a new film in Mexico, his first film made there since Amores Perros 20 years previously, and his third Spanish-Language film after Amores Perros and Biutiful. The film entitled Bardo, False Chronicle of a Handful of Truths, stars Daniel Giménez Cacho and Griselda Siciliani.

Short films 

From 2001 to 2011, Iñárritu directed several short films. In 2001, he directed an 11-minute film segment for 11'09"01 September 11 - which is composed of several short films that explore the effects of the 9/11 terrorist attacks from different points of view around the world. In 2007, he made ANNA, part of French anthology film Chacun son cinéma, which screened at the 2007 Cannes Film Festival. Chacun son cinéma, a collection of 33 short films by 35 renowned film directors representing 25 countries, was produced for the 60th anniversary of the film festival. In 2012, Iñárritu made the experimental short film Naran Ja: One Act Orange Dance, inspired by L.A Dance Project's premiere performance, featuring excerpts from the new choreography Benjamin Millepied crafted for Moving Parts. The story takes place in a secluded, dusty space and centers around LADP dancer Julia Eichten.

Commercials 
In 2002, Iñárritu directed "Powder Keg", an episode for the BMW short film series The Hire, starring Clive Owen as the driver and Stellan Skarsgård as a war photographer. It won the Cannes Gold Lion Advertising Award. In 2010, Iñárritu directed "Write the Future", a football-themed commercial for Nike ahead of the 2010 FIFA World Cup, which went on to win the Grand Prix at the Cannes Lions Advertising Festival. In 2012, he directed Procter & Gamble's "Best Job" commercial spot for the 2012 Olympic Ceremonies. It won the Best Primetime Commercial Emmy at Creative Arts Emmy Awards and the DGA Award for Outstanding Directorial Achievement in Commercials.

On 4 October 2012, Facebook released an Iñárritu-directed brand film titled The Things That Connect Us to celebrate the social network reaching one billion users.

Virtual reality 

Iñárritu's virtual reality project Carne y Arena was the first ever VR installation presented at the Cannes Film Festival in 2017. Carne y Arena was also presented, at LACMA, Washington DC and featured at the Prada Foundation in Milan. Additionally, Carne y Arena was awarded the first Special Achievement Academy Award in over 20 years at the Academy's 9th Annual Governors Awards.

Influences
Iñarritu's cinematic influences include Max Ophüls, Robert Altman, Sidney Lumet, Ingmar Bergman, Federico Fellini, Luis Buñuel, Andrei Tarkovsky, Sergio Leone, Martin Scorsese, and John Cassavetes. However, his influences are not limited to film and come from a variety of sources.

Filmography

Feature films

Short films

Commercials

As producer only

 Nine Lives (2005) – executive producer
 Rudo y Cursi (2008)
 Mother and Child (2009) – executive producer

Critical reception

Accolades and honors

Iñárritu has been recognized with multiple awards for his films, including five Academy Awards, two Directors Guild of America Awards, a Producers Guild of America Award, three British Academy Film Awards, three AACTA Awards, three Golden Globe Awards, two Independent Spirit Awards, two American Film Institute Awards, and three Cannes Film Festival Award. He is the first Mexican director to be nominated for the Academy Award for Best Director and the Directors Guild of America Award for Outstanding Directing, and the first to win the Best Director Award at the Cannes Film Festival. In 2015, Iñárritu won, among many other accolades, the Directors Guild Award for Outstanding Directing, the Producers Guild of America Award for Best Theatrical Motion Picture, and the Academy Award for Best Picture, Best Original Screenplay and Best Directing for Birdman, becoming the first Mexican to win three Academy awards. In 2016, Iñárritu won the Academy Award for Best Director for his work on The Revenant, marking the first time in 65 years that a director has won the award in two consecutive years. Iñárritu is the third director to accomplish this feat, following John Ford and Joseph L. Mankiewicz.

In 2006, Iñárritu was honored at the Gotham Awards' World Cinema Tribute, alongside fellow Mexican filmmakers Alfonso Cuarón and Guillermo del Toro. In 2011, he was honored with a Lifetime Achievement Award at Zurich Film Festival. In 2015, Iñárritu received the Sundance Institute's Vanguard Leadership Award for the "originality and independent spirit" of his films. He was also honored by the Los Angeles County Museum of Art at its Art + Film Gala. That year he received an honorary doctorate from the National Autonomous University of Mexico. In 2019, he was also made Commander of the Order of the Arts and Letters in France. 

Directed Academy Award performances

Personal life
Iñárritu is married to Maria Eladia Hagerman, an editor and graphic designer. They have a daughter, Maria Eladia, and a son, Eliseo.

In 2009, Iñárritu, along with several filmmakers and actors, signed a petition in support of director Roman Polanski following his arrest in relation to his 1977 sexual abuse charges, who had been detained while traveling to a film festival, which the petition argued would undermine the tradition of film festivals as a place for works to be shown "freely and safely", and that arresting filmmakers traveling to neutral countries could open the door "for actions of which no-one can know the effects."

See also

 Cinema of Mexico
 Cha Cha Cha Films
 List of directors with two or more Academy Awards for Best Director

Notes

References

External links

 
 
 

1963 births
Living people
Cannes Film Festival Award for Best Director winners
Best Directing Academy Award winners
Best Director AACTA International Award winners
Best Director Ariel Award winners
Best Director BAFTA Award winners
Best Director Golden Globe winners
Best Original Screenplay Academy Award winners
Best Screenplay AACTA International Award winners
Best Screenplay Golden Globe winners
Directors Guild of America Award winners
Filmmakers who won the Best Film BAFTA Award
Filmmakers who won the Best Foreign Language Film BAFTA Award
Producers who won the Best Picture Academy Award
English-language film directors
Spanish-language film directors
Film directors from Mexico City
Mexican film producers
Mexican filmmakers
Mexican screenwriters
Mexican people of Basque descent
Mexican people of Spanish descent
Universidad Iberoamericana alumni
Writers from Mexico City
20th-century Mexican male writers
21st-century Mexican male writers
20th-century Mexican writers
21st-century Mexican writers